Lobofemora scheirei is a species of stick insects in the tribe Clitumnini.  This species was found in the seasonal tropical forests of the Dong Nai Biosphere Reserve (type locality), which includes Cát Tiên National Park, Vietnam.
It is named after the Belgian comedian, TV host and self-declared nerd Lieven Scheire.

References

External links
 Images at Phasmida Species File
 Image at iNaturalist
 Images at L'insecterie

Phasmatodea of Indo-China
Phasmatidae